The Order of Merit of Rhineland-Palatinate is a civil order of merit, of the German State of Rhineland-Palatinate. The order is presented for outstanding service to the state and people of Rhineland-Palatinate. It was founded on 2 October 1981, and first awarded in 1982. The order is limited to 800 living recipients.  Through 2012, the order had been awarded 1035 times.

References 

Rhineland-Palatinate
Rhineland-Palatinate
Culture of Rhineland-Palatinate